Katharine Ann Johnson "Kathy" Rayner (born 1944/1945) is an American billionaire heiress.

Early life
She was born Katharine Ann Johnson to Anne Cox Chambers and Louis G. Johnson. Her maternal grandfather is James M. Cox. She has a sister Margaretta Taylor, and a half-brother James Cox Chambers, from her mother's second marriage.

Wealth and Philanthropy
In 2015, Rayner's mother Anne Cox Chambers distributed her 49% share in Cox Enterprises equally between her three children. As of September 2020, her net worth is US$5.2 billion.

In 2019, she donated over $5 million to the Animal Medical Center in New York City.

Personal life
She has been married twice. She married Jesse Kornbluth, a magazine writer, on May 26, 1984. They eventually divorced. Her second husband was painter and travel writer William P. "Billy" Rayner, who died on January 22, 2018, at the age of 88.

Rayner lives in East Hampton, New York.

References

American billionaires
Female billionaires
Cox family
Living people
Place of birth missing (living people)
1940s births